The Labette Cardinals are the sports teams of Labette Community College located in Parsons, Kansas. They participate in the NAIA and in the Kansas Jayhawk Community College Conference.

Sports

Men's sports
Baseball
Basketball
Spirit Squad
Wrestling

Women's sports
Basketball
Spirit Squad
Softball
Volleyball

References

External links
 

Sports teams in Kansas